Ioannis Stathopoulos (1934 – 31 October 2021) was a Greek politician. A member of the New Democracy party, he served in the Hellenic Parliament from 1974 to 1993 and was Deputy Minister for National Defense from 1991 to 1993.

References

1934 births
2021 deaths
New Democracy (Greece) politicians
Politicians from Athens
Greek MPs 1974–1977
Greek MPs 1977–1981
Greek MPs 1981–1985
Greek MPs 1985–1989
Greek MPs 1989 (June–November)
Greek MPs 1989–1990
Greek MPs 1990–1993